The 2021 ATP Cup was the second edition of the ATP Cup, an international outdoor hard court men's team tennis tournament held by the Association of Tennis Professionals (ATP). It was held with 12 teams at Melbourne Park in Australia, from 2 to 7 February 2021.

It was originally supposed to take place with 24 teams in Brisbane, Perth and Sydney from 1 to 10 January 2021, but was changed due to the impact of the COVID-19 pandemic.

Following a case of COVID-19 in the tournament's quarantine hotel, all matches scheduled for 4 February have been suspended.

Team Serbia was the defending champion, but got eliminated in the group stage. Team Russia won the tournament, defeating Italy 2–0 in the final.

ATP ranking points

 Maximum 500 points for undefeated singles player, 250 points for doubles.

Entries
11 countries qualified based on the ATP ranking of its highest-ranked singles player on 4 January 2021, and their commitment to play at the event. Host country Australia received a wild card. Switzerland withdrew after world number 5 Roger Federer was ruled unfit to compete at the event due to a knee injury.

Group stage
The 12 teams were divided into four groups of three teams each in a round-robin format. The winners of each group will qualify for the semifinals.

Overview
T = Ties, M = Matches, S = Sets

Group A

Serbia vs. Canada

Germany vs. Canada

Serbia vs. Germany

Group B

Spain vs. Australia

Greece vs. Australia

Spain vs. Greece 

Note: By ATP Cup rules retired match is not counting into percentage of sets and games.

Group C

Austria vs. Italy

Italy vs. France

Austria vs. France 

Note: By ATP Cup rules retired match is not counting into percentage of sets and games.

Group D

Russia vs. Argentina

Russia vs. Japan

Argentina vs. Japan

Knockout stage

Bracket

Semi-finals

Germany vs. Russia

Italy vs. Spain

Final

Russia vs. Italy

References

External links
Official website
Draw

2021
2021 ATP Tour
2021 in Australian tennis
February 2021 sports events in Australia
Tennis events postponed due to the COVID-19 pandemic